The 1954 Rutgers Queensmen football team represented Rutgers University in the 1954 college football season. In their 13th season under head coach Harvey Harman, the Queensmen compiled a 3–6 record and were outscored by their opponents 145 to 140.

Schedule

References

Rutgers
Rutgers Scarlet Knights football seasons
Rutgers Queensmen football